Thomas Smyth (1650–1725) was a Church of Ireland clergyman who served as Bishop of Limerick from 1695 to 1725.

Life
Smyth was born at Dundrum to William Smyth and Mary Dewdall. He was educated at Trinity College, Dublin and became vice-chancellor of the College in 1714.
 
A former Dean of Emly, Smyth was nominated Bishop of Limerick, Ardfert and Aghadoe on 15 November 1695 and consecrated on 8 December 1695. He died on 4 May 1725.

Family
Smyth married Dorothea, daughter of Ulysses Burgh, Bishop of Ardagh and Mary Kingsmill, and had 10 sons and 3 daughters, including:
Charles Smyth (1693-1784), MP for Limerick
George Smyth (1705-1772), lawyer and judge 
Arthur Smyth (1706-1771), Archbishop of Dublin

References

1650 births
1725 deaths
18th-century Anglican bishops in Ireland
Deans of Emly
Bishops of Limerick, Ardfert and Aghadoe